The 15th TVyNovelas Awards, is an Academy of special awards to the best of soap operas and TV shows. The awards ceremony took place on May 15, 1997 in the Teatro Alameda, San Ángel, México D.F. The ceremony was televised in the Mexico by Canal de las estrellas.

Raúl Velasco, Marco Antonio Regil, Julissa and Liza Echeverría hosted the show. Cañaveral de Pasiones won 10 awards including Best Telenovela of the Year, the most for the evening. Other winners La antorcha encendida won 9 awards, Luz Clarita, Bendita mentira, Sentimientos ajenos won 2 awards and Tú y yo won 1 award.

Summary of awards and nominations

Winners and nominees

Novelas

Others

Special Awards 
 Best Latin Hostess International Projection: Cristina Saralegui
 Best Costume Design: Cristina Bauza and Beatrice Vázquez for La antorcha encendida
 Best Editing: Marcelino Gómez and Roberto Nino for La antorcha encendida
 Career as an Actress: Jacqueline Andere
 Career as an Actor: Ernesto Alonso
 Career Female Singer: María Victoria
 Career Male Singer: Pedro Fernández

Commercial Awards 
 The Best Figure: Mónika Sánchez awarded for Super Jeans Shop
 The Best Skin: Ana Patricia Rojo awarded for Lubrider

Missing 
People who did not attend ceremony wing and were nominated in the shortlist in each category:
 Benjamín Cann
 Humberto Zurita
 Jorge Russek (for health reasons they receive their daughters Zully and Vanessa)

References 

TVyNovelas Awards
TVyNovelas Awards
TVyNovelas Awards
TVyNovelas Awards ceremonies